John Morgan (18 February 1742 – 27 June 1792) was a Welsh politician who sat in the House of Commons  from 1769 to 1792. 

Morgan was the youngest son of Sir Thomas Morgan and his wife, Jane.

He entered the House of Commons in 1769 as Member of Parliament for Brecon, succeeding his brother Sir Charles Morgan. In 1771, he accepted the Stewardship of the Manor of East Hendred in order to enter the by-election at Monmouthshire, replacing his late brother Sir Thomas Morgan. Unusually, given the immense Morgan influence in Brecknockshire and Monmouthshire, the election was contested, albeit unsuccessfully, by Valentine Morris.

His elder brothers having died without issue, John Morgan inherited the Tredegar Estate in 1787. Finding himself in urgent need of an heir, he married Louisa Pym Burt, a woman who was more than twenty-five years his junior. Unfortunately, the marriage did not result in any children, and when John Morgan died in 1792, the Tredegar Estate passed by arrangement to his sister Jane and her husband Sir Charles Gould, on condition they changed their name to Morgan.

References

1742 births
1792 deaths
British MPs 1768–1774
British MPs 1774–1780
British MPs 1780–1784
British MPs 1784–1790
British MPs 1790–1796
Members of the Parliament of Great Britain for Welsh constituencies